Abraham Sojo (born 21 July 1955) is a Venezuelan former tennis player.

Born in Barlovento, Sojo represented Venezuela in four Davis Cup ties and was a singles bronze medalist at the 1978 Central American and Caribbean Games in Medellín.

Sojo now coaches tennis and was briefly captain of Venezuela's Davis Cup team in 1992.

References

External links
 
 

1955 births
Living people
Venezuelan male tennis players
Competitors at the 1978 Central American and Caribbean Games
Central American and Caribbean Games medalists in tennis
Central American and Caribbean Games bronze medalists for Venezuela
20th-century Venezuelan people
21st-century Venezuelan people